Mary Bird may refer to:
Mary Bird (medical missionary) (1859–1914), English Christian missionary to Iran
Mary Bird (skier) (1910–2002), American alpine skier, competitor at the 1936 Winter Olympics.
Mary Brave Bird (1954–2013), Sicangu Lakota writer and activist